Micro Tech Global Foundation (MTGF) is an Indian non-profit and non-governmental organization which focuses on promoting the fields of education, research, sports, art and culture. Set up by security devices manufacturer Micro Technologies (India) Limited in 2010 as a corporate social endeavour, MTGF strives to amalgamate technology with both sports and cultural activities, and also offered support to innovators.

Projects 
In September 2010, MTGF began working with Rasika Ranjani Sabha to open a recreational complex for citizens to promote art, culture, music, sports and health.
MTGF promotes innovation by supporting student technology projects through their Micro Innovation League which culminated in an exhibition for the projects in the following fields: 'Information Technology' (Embedded or Hardware), 'Security Based Technology' and 'Mobile Based Technology'.  35,000 rupees were awarded to the winner of the league. After a successful event in 2012, MTGF announced that the MIL would become an annual event from 2013.
MTGF has opened branches in Europe, America and Africa. Rwanda was the first African country which MTGF has branched into, with MTGF planning to invest several million US dollars to promote development in education, information and communications technology, health and good governance, among others.
MTGF has published a series of books on security requirements of various states in India as well as other countries such as Australia, Israel and the United States. An example is Security Requirements of Mumbai - A National Perspective. MTGF's Chairman, Dr. P Sekhar, has additionally published books on "Secured Governance", highlighting the prospects of national growth through tourism in India and how the security requirements in tourism can boost the economy.
MTGF partnered with other organizations to organize a disaster management programme for schoolchildren, who were able to watch a live staged demonstration of a rescue operation, including fire-fighting, rescue of victims from high buildings, bomb detection (with the aid of dogs) and disposal and first aid. There was also an exhibition of modern rescue equipment.
MTGF has organized the "Micro Premier League" (MPL) for young and unprivileged people to get involved in sports at an early age through training camps with specialized trainers for sports such as cricket, badminton, table tennis, volleyball and football, amongst others. An extension to the programme was the MPL Cup, an annual football tournament for youth which was watched by over 15,000 people in 2012.

References

External links 
 Official website

Non-profit organisations based in India
Organizations established in 2010
2010 establishments in India